Hera Björk Þórhallsdóttir (born 29 March 1972) is an Icelandic singer. She is known for representing Iceland in the Eurovision Song Contest 2010 with the song "Je ne sais quoi" and her participation at Viña del Mar International Song Festival 2013, in Chile. She represented Iceland in the International Competition and she won in the Best Song category.

Discography

Albums
 1999: "Litla Hryllingsbúðin (Little shop of Horror)", "Alltaf í Boltanum - Áfram Ísland", "Principium -Schola Cantorum"
 2000: "Ilmur af Jólum / The Scent of Christmas", " Disneylögin"
 2001: "Landslag Bylgjunnar - Engum nema þér", "Audi Creator Coeli"
 2002: "Svarta Platan", "Á Jólunum"
 2003: "Í faðmi þínum"
 2004: "Við gefum von"
 2006: Hera Björk solo album
 2007: "Montagne Azzurre - Leone Tinganelli"
 2008: The Frostroses - Live in Concert",
 2009: "The Frostroses - Heyr himnasmiður",  "Ást og Tregi -  Heimir Sindrason", "Húm (söngvar um ástina og lífið) -Stefán Hilmarsson"
 2010: Je Ne Sais Quoi 2013: Because You Can'', "Ilmur af jólum 2"

Singles

References

External links

 Hera Björk homepage

1972 births
Living people
Eurovision Song Contest entrants of 2010
Eurovision Song Contest entrants for Iceland
Dansk Melodi Grand Prix contestants
Musicians from Reykjavík
21st-century Icelandic women singers